Linyi (547) is a Type 054A frigate of the People's Liberation Army Navy. She was commissioned on 22 December 2012.

Development and design 

The Type 054A carries HQ-16 medium-range air defence missiles and anti-submarine missiles in a vertical launching system (VLS). The HQ-16 has a range of up to 50 km, with superior range and engagement angles to the Type 054's HQ-7. The Type 054A's VLS uses a hot launch method; a shared standard exhaust system is sited between the two rows of rectangular launching tubes.

The four AK-630 close-in weapon systems (CIWS) of Type 054 were replaced with two Type 730 CIWS on Type 054A. The autonomous Type 730 provides improved reaction time against close-in threats.

Construction and career 
Linyi was launched in December 2011 at the China State Shipbuilding Corporation in Shanghai. Commissioned on 22 December 2012.

On 17 August 2015, Taizhou, Linyi, Hengyang, Taihu and Yunwu Shan participated in the Joint Sea 2015 II in the Sea of Japan.

Gallery

References 

2011 ships
Ships built in China
Type 054 frigates